This is a list of medical schools in Uganda:

See also
 List of university leaders in Uganda
 List of universities in Uganda
 List of business schools in Uganda
 List of law schools in Uganda
 Medical school in Uganda
 Education in Uganda

References

External links
 Ugandan medical schools on Google Maps (incomplete)
 Doctors Get Offers They Can't Resist
 How Africa's Researchers Are Solving Africa's Health Problems

Uganda
Medical schools